The Boston and Providence Railroad Bridge in East Providence is a railroad bridge on the East Junction Branch spanning Ten Mile River.  A portion of the bridge also spans Roger Williams Avenue.  The bridge was built in 1884 by the Boston and Providence Railroad, replacing an earlier structure on the line.  The bridge abutments are faced in coursed ashlar stone, with brick-faced segmental-arch tunnels piercing them.  The main span of the bridge consists of two Warren trusses resting on the abutments and a central pier in the Ten Mile River.

The bridge was listed on the National Register of Historic Places in 1980. It continues in active service carrying Providence and Worcester Railroad freight trains between East Providence and Seekonk, Massachusetts.

See also
List of bridges on the National Register of Historic Places in Rhode Island
National Register of Historic Places listings in Providence County, Rhode Island

References

External links

Railroad bridges on the National Register of Historic Places in Rhode Island
Bridges completed in 1884
Railroad bridges in Rhode Island
Bridges in Providence County, Rhode Island
Old Colony Railroad
National Register of Historic Places in Providence County, Rhode Island
1884 establishments in Rhode Island
Stone arch bridges in the United States
Warren truss bridges in the United States
Providence and Worcester Railroad